Esko Salminen (born 12 October 1940, in Helsinki) is a Finnish actor with careers on television, the stage and on the silver screen.

He has had three marriages: (1961–1963); [(1971–1981); and (present). He had two children with his second wife, one of whom is an actor.

Selected filmography
The Dissidents (2017)
August Fools (2013)
Härmä (2012)
The Storage (2011)
Unna ja Nuuk (2006)
Mother of Mine (2005)
Aapo (1994)
The Last Border (1993)
Hamlet Goes Business (1987)
Sign of the Beast (1981)
Flame Top (1980)
Poet and Muse (1978)
Speedy Gonzales - noin 7 veljeksen poika (English title Speedy Gonzales - The Son of About Seven Brothers) (1970)
Nutty Finland (1967)

External links

1940 births
Living people
Male actors from Helsinki
20th-century Finnish male actors
21st-century Finnish male actors
Finnish male film actors
Finnish male stage actors
Finnish male television actors